Enric Tarrado Vives is an Andorran politician and former ambassador. From 2005 until 2009 he was a member of the Consell General, the legislative branch of Andorra, where he was chairman of the fraction of the party "Andorran Democratic Centre + Segle XXI". In 2019 he stood again for the Consell Generall as the leader of the "Andorran Democratic Centre and Independents" in the parish Andorra la Vella, but was defeated by the party d'Acord by 12 votes (0.26 % point). 

From 2012 until his decision to stand in the 2019 elections, he was ambassador of Andorra to Liechtenstein, Monaco, San Marino and Switzerland, as well as permanent representative of Andorra to the United Nations Office at Geneva.

References

1962 births
Living people
Andorran diplomats
Andorran politicians
Ambassadors of Andorra to Liechtenstein
Ambassadors of Andorra to Monaco
Ambassadors of Andorra to San Marino
Ambassadors of Andorra to Switzerland
Permanent Representatives of Andorra to the United Nations